Infante Sancho of Castile (1233 – 27 October 1261) was Archbishop of Toledo and Chancellor of Castile from 1259 until his death.

Biography 

Sancho was the seventh child and sixth son of King Ferdinand III of Castile and his first wife, Elisabeth of Swabia. His father had him and his older brother Philip prepared for an ecclesiastical career. Their paternal grandmother, the former Queen Berengaria of Castile, entrusted Rodrigo Jiménez de Rada, Archbishop of Toledo, with their upbringing. The Archbishop sent the infantes to the University of Paros, where they were taught by Albert the Great. 

Infante Sancho became Archbishop of Toledo in 1259. He was present at the Cortes of Seville in 1261, but the Infante's entry with archepiscopal cross in December 1260 caused an incident involving him and Raimundo de Losana, Archbishop of Seville. The Archbishop of Seville was offended and considered this a threat to the autonomy of his see. Sancho, however, stated that that was not his intention.

Archbishop Sancho died aged 28. The place of his burial is uncertain; he may have been buried in the Cathedral of Toledo or in the Abbey of Santa María la Real de Las Huelgas.

Ancestors

Bibliography 
González Jiménez, Manuel: Alfonso X el Sabio. Barcelona: Editorial Ariel S. A. .

See also 
Frederick of Castile
Henry of Castile the Senator
Christina of Norway, Infanta of Castile

References

External links 
 Genealogy of Sancho de Castilla

|-

1233 births
1261 deaths
Castilian infantes
Archbishops of Toledo
Castilian House of Burgundy
13th-century Roman Catholic archbishops in Castile
Sons of kings